Lactobacillus helveticus is a lactic-acid producing, rod-shaped bacterium of the genus Lactobacillus.  It is most commonly used in the production of American Swiss cheese and Emmental cheese, but is also sometimes used in making other styles of cheese, such as Cheddar, Parmesan, Romano, provolone, and mozzarella.  The primary function of L. helveticus culture is to prevent bitterness and produce nutty flavors in the final cheese. In Emmental cheese production, L. helveticus is used in conjunction with a Propionibacterium culture, which is responsible for developing the holes (known as "eyes") through production of carbon dioxide gas.

Ingestion of powdered milk fermented with L. helveticus was shown to decrease blood pressure due to the presence of manufactured tripeptides that have ACE inhibitor activity. However, results have been contradictory in later studies.

The bacterium's specific name is an adjective derived from "Helvetia", the Latin name for the region occupied by the ancient Helvetii (and for modern Switzerland).  The bacterium is also used as probiotic.

See also
Lactic acid bacteria

References

External links
Lactobacillus helveticus
Type strain of Lactobacillus helveticus at BacDive -  the Bacterial Diversity Metadatabase

Lactobacillaceae
Bacteria used in dairy products
Bacteria described in 1919